Carl Wilhelm Ramsauer (6 February 1879 – 24 December 1955) was a German professor of physics and research physicist, famous for the discovery of the Ramsauer–Townsend effect.  He pioneered the field of electron and proton collisions with gas molecules.

Early life 

Ramsauer was born in Osternburg, Oldenburg. From 1897 to 1907, he studied at the Munich, Tübingen, Berlin, Kiel, London, and Breslau Universities. He was awarded his doctorate at Kiel.

Career 
From 1907 to 1909, Ramsauer was a teaching assistant to Philipp Lenard in the physics department at the Ruprecht Karl University of Heidelberg. It was here that he conducted research on the quantum effect of the transparency of noble gases to slow electrons, known as the Ramsauer–Townsend effect.  Subsequently,   he was a staff scientist at the Radiological Institute in Heidelberg.  During World War I, he served as an artillery officer.  From 1921, he was an ordinarius professor at the Danzig Technische Hochschule.

From 1928 to 1945, he was director of the research division of the Allgemeine Elektrizitäts-Gesellschaft (AEG), an electric combine with headquarters in Berlin and Frankfurt am Main. During the period 1931 to 1945, in addition to his position at AEG, he was honorary professor at the Berlin Technische Hochschule; the title meant that he was authorized to teach at the facility, but not required. From 1945, he was ordinarius professor and director of the physics department at the Berlin Technische Hochschule.

From 1937, Ramsauer was chairman of the Berlin Section of the Deutsche Physikalische Gesellschaft (DPG), and from 1940 to 1945 the general chairman, i.e., president of the entire DPG. As president, Ramsauer and his deputy Wolfgang Finkelnburg took an independent course of action from the party line and against Deutsche Physik, which was anti-Semitic and had a bias against theoretical physics, especially including quantum mechanics.  In taking this stance, they were supported by others, including Max Wien and Ludwig Prandtl.

Early in 1942, as chairman of the DPG, Ramsauer, with the support of Ludwig Prandtl, submitted a petition to Reich Minister Bernhard Rust, at the Reichserziehungsministerium (Reich Education Ministry).  The petition, a letter and six attachments, addressed the atrocious state of physics instruction in Germany, which Ramsauer concluded was the result of politicization of education.

Ramsauer was editor of the journals Zeitschrift für technische Physik and Physik in regelmässigen Berichten.  The former journal, founded in 1919, was directed to  industrial physicists and engineers, and it was a publication of the German Society of Technical Physics (Deutsche Gesellschaft für technische Physik).  The latter journal, founded in 1933, was a supplement to the Zeitschrift für technische Physik.

Ramsauer retired in 1955 and died shortly thereafter.

Internal report 

The following was published in Kernphysikalische Forschungsberichte (Research Reports in Nuclear Physics), an internal publication of the German Uranverein.  Reports in this publication were classified Top Secret, they had very limited distribution, and the authors were not allowed to keep copies.  The reports were confiscated under the Allied Operation Alsos and sent to the United States Atomic Energy Commission for evaluation.  In 1971, the reports were declassified and returned to Germany. The reports are available at the Karlsruhe Nuclear Research Center and the American Institute of Physics.

 Carl Ramsauer Über Leistung und Organisation der angelsächsischen Physik: Mit Ausblicken für die deutsche Physik 2 April 1943. G-241.

Books 

Carl Ramsauer Physik, Technik, Pädagogik (Braun, 1949)
Carl Ramsauer Grundversuche der Physik in historischer Darstellung. Bd. 1. Von den Fallgesetzen bis zu den elektrischen Wellen (Springer, 1953)
Carl Ramsauer Rudolf Kollath, and Ernst Brüche Wirkungsquerschnitt der Edelgase gegenüber langsamen Elektronen (Geest & Portig, 1954)
 Theodor Pöschl, Carl Ramsauer, and Ernst Brüche Die Physik in Einzelberichten. H. 1. Mechanik (J. A. Barth, 1956)
Heinz Thiede, Carl Ramsauer, and Ernst Brüche Die Physik in Einzelberichten. H. 2. Praktische Akustik (J. A. Barth, 1957)
Helmut Moser, Carl Ramsauer, and Ernst Brüche Die Physik in Einzelberichten. H. 3. Wärmelehre 1. Mit Beitr. (J. A. Barth, 1957)

Selected publications 

Carl Ramsauer Über den Wirkungsquerschnitt der Gasmoleküle gegenüber langsamen Elektronen, Annalen der Physik (4) 64 513–540 (1921). (Received 7 September 1920, published in issue No. 6 of 31 March 1921.)

Honors 
The Carl-Ramsauer Award in physics was instituted in honor of Ramsauer's pioneering work in industrial physics research.

References 

Sources
Beyerchen, Alan D. Scientists Under Hitler: Politics and the Physics Community in the Third Reich (Yale, 1977) 
Hentschel, Klaus, editor and Ann M. Hentschel, editorial assistant and Translator Physics and National Socialism: An Anthology of Primary Sources (Birkhäuser, 1996)
Hoffmann, Dieter Between Autonomy and Accommodation: The German Physical Society during the Third Reich, Physics in Perspective 7(3) 293–329 (2005)
Mehra, Jagdish, and Helmut Rechenberg The Historical Development of Quantum Theory.  Volume 1 Part 2 The Quantum Theory of Planck, Einstein, Bohr and Sommerfeld 1900–1925: Its Foundation and the Rise of Its Difficulties. (Springer, 1982)  
Walker, Mark German National Socialism and the Quest for Nuclear Power 1939–1949 (Cambridge, 1993) 

1879 births
1955 deaths
20th-century German physicists
Alumni of the University of London
Nuclear program of Nazi Germany
People from Oldenburg (city)
Academic staff of the Technical University of Berlin